Acta Mathematica Sinica (English series) is a peer-reviewed mathematics journal published quarterly by Springer.
Founded in 1936 and split into a Chinese series and an English series in 1985, the journal publishes articles on all areas of mathematics, and allows submissions from researchers of all nationalities. The journal is indexed by Mathematical Reviews and Zentralblatt MATH.
Its 2009 MCQ was 0.42, and its 2021 impact factor was 0.833.

Abstracting and indexing
This journal is indexed by the following services:

 Chinese Science Citation Database
 Mathematical Reviews
 Science Citation Index
 Scopus 
 Zentralblatt Math
 Referativnyi Zhurnal (VINITI)

References

External links

Mathematics journals
Publications established in 1985
English-language journals
Springer Science+Business Media academic journals
Monthly journals